Venzóleo was a professional club. The club has won one First Division titles in the amateur era. The club is based in Caracas.

Honours
Primera División Venezolana: 1
Winners (1): 1927
Runner-up (2): 1925, 1926

External links
Venzóleo 

Football clubs in Venezuela
Football clubs in Caracas
Defunct football clubs in Venezuela